In mathematics, the Paley–Zygmund inequality bounds the
probability that a positive random variable is small, in terms of
its first two moments. The inequality was
proved by Raymond Paley and Antoni Zygmund.

Theorem: If Z ≥ 0 is a random variable with
finite variance, and if , then

Proof: First, 

The first addend is at most , while the second is at most  by the Cauchy–Schwarz inequality. The desired inequality then follows. ∎

Related inequalities 

The Paley–Zygmund inequality can be written as

This can be improved. By the Cauchy–Schwarz inequality,

which, after rearranging, implies that

This inequality is sharp; equality is achieved if Z almost surely equals a positive constant.

In turn, this implies another convenient form (known as Cantelli's inequality) which is

This follows from the substitution  valid when .

A strengthened form of the Paley-Zygmund inequality states that if Z is a non-negative random variable then

for every .
This inequality follows by applying the usual Paley-Zygmund inequality to the conditional distribution of Z given that it is positive and noting that the various factors of  cancel.

Both this inequality and the usual Paley-Zygmund inequality also admit  versions: If Z is a non-negative random variable and  then

for every . This follows by the same proof as above but using Hölder's inequality in place of the Cauchy-Schwarz inequality.

See also
 Cantelli's inequality
 Second moment method
 Concentration inequality – a summary of tail-bounds on random variables.

References

Further reading

Probabilistic inequalities